Non Stop Dancing '65 is a 1965 album by the James Last Band, conducted and arranged by James Last, engineered by Peter Klemt, recorded at Polydor studios in Hamburg, Germany.

This album was the first in a series of about 30 Non Stop Dancing albums.  The final official entry of the series was in 1984, although Last continued to make a few similar albums (Für alle, 1985; Dance, Dance, Dance, 1988; New Party Classics, 2002).

Track listing
From the 1965 Polydor release no. 237.447

 "Don't Ha Ha" (The Governors)
 "Shake Hands" (Drafi Deutscher)
 "Can't Buy Me Love" (Beatles)
 "Skinny Minnie" (Tony Sheridan)
 "Do Wah Diddy, Diddy" (Manfred Mann)
 "Clap Hands" (James Last)
 "Pretty Woman" (Roy Orbison)
 "Das ist die Frage aller Fragen" (Cliff Richard)
 "Eight Days a Week" (Beatles)
 "Kiddy, Kiddy, Kiss Me" (Rita Pavone + Paul Anka)
 "Good Bye, Good Bye, Good Bye" (Peggy March)
 "My Boy Lollipop" (Millie)
 "Zwei Mädchen aus Germany" (Paul Anka)
 "Tennessee Waltz" (Alma Cogan)
 "Memphis Tennessee" (Dave Clark Five)
 "A Hard Day's Night" (Beatles)
 "I Feel Fine" (Beatles)
 "No Reply" (Beatles)
 "Kiss and Shake" (Renate Kern)
 "Downtown" (Petula Clark)
 "Cinderella Baby" (Drafi Deutscher)
 "Wer kann das schon?" (Peter Beil)
 "Das war mein schönster Tanz" (Bernd Spier)
 "Rag Doll" (Four Seasons)
 "Melancholie" (Die Bambies)
 "I Want To Hold Your Hand" (Beatles)
 "Sie liebt dich" (Beatles)
 "I Should Have Known Better" (Beatles)

Personnel 
 Manfred Moch - Trumpet
 Detlef Surmann - Trombone
 Jo Ment - Sax
 Willi Surmann - Sax
 Bernd Steffanowski - Guitar
 Heinz Schulze - Guitar
 Fritz (Fiete) Wacker - Bass
 Robert Last - Drums
 Günter Platzek - Piano & Organ
 James Last - Arranger, Conductor

1965 albums
James Last Orchestra albums
Albums produced by James Last
Albums arranged by James Last
Albums conducted by James Last
Polydor Records albums